Selwyn Gwillym Blaylock (February 18, 1879 – November 19, 1945) was a part of starting the mining industry in western Canada. He was president of Teck Resources, recipient of several international awards for his work in metallurgy, and was the President of the Canadian Institute of Mining, Metallurgy and Petroleum in 1934–35. For his work he was inducted into the Canadian Mining Hall of Fame.

Early life
He was born in Paspébiac, Quebec. Blaylock attended Bishop's College School in Lennoxville, Quebec. In 1899, he obtained a B.Sc. from McGill University.

Career
After graduating, he moved west and obtained work as a surveyor for the Canadian Smelting Works in Trail, British Columbia. Two years later, he became the company's chief chemist, but soon moved to Nelson, British Columbia to become general superintendent of the Hall Mines Smelter, then general superintendent of the St. Eugene mines. In 1908, Blaylock joined the Consolidated Mining and Smelting Company (Cominco). In 1919, he became Cominco's general manager. In 1922 a director, vice-president in 1927, managing director in 1938 and president in 1939.

Blaylock worked at the Cominco smelter until six months before he died in Trail in 1945. He was buried at Danville, Quebec.

Honours
inducted into the Canadian Mining Hall of Fame
awarded the McCharles Prize from the University of Toronto for outstanding work in Canadian Metallurgy
1928, awarded the James Douglas Medal for Metallurgy by the American Institute of Mining and Metallurgy
1930, presented with an honorary degree by the University of Alberta 
1935, awarded the Inco Medal by The Canadian Institute of Mining and Metallurgy for outstanding work in mining and smelting
1944, made an honorary member of the American Institute of Mining, Metallurgical, and Petroleum Engineers 
1944, Gold Medal of the Institute of Mining and Metallurgy of Great Britain
1948, the Canadian Institute of Mining, Metallurgy and Petroleum established the Selwyn G. Blaylock Medal. It is presented annually to an individual that has demonstrated distinguished service to Canada through exceptional achievement in the field of mining, metallurgy, or geology
1961, Blaylock Creek was named in his honour

References
Blaylock Estates
Blaylock Creek
Milestones of Canadian Chemistry

External links
History of Bishop's College School
Canadian Mining Hall of Fame
Selwyn G. Blaylok Medal
AIME Honorary Membership
Blaylock Resort and Health Spa
Trail, BC Historical Society
Mineralogical Association of Canada

See also 
List of Bishop's College School alumni

1879 births
1945 deaths
Canadian geologists
McGill University alumni
Bishop's College School alumni
People from Gaspésie–Îles-de-la-Madeleine